Wuqi District is a coastal suburban district in southern Taichung, Taiwan. The Port of Taichung is located in Wuqi District.

History
After the handover of Taiwan from Japan to the Republic of China in 1945, Wuqi was organized as an urban township of Taichung County. On 25 December 2010, Taichung County was merged with Taichung City and Wuqi was upgraded to a district of the city.

Administrative divisions 
Dingliao, Xialiao, Zhongzheng, Zhonghe, Wenhua, Anren, Caonan, Nanjian, Fude, Dazhuang, Dacun, Xingnong, Yongning and Yongan Village.

Climate

Economy 
 Fishing
 Tourism on the coast

Tourist attractions 
 Haotian Temple
 Mitsui Outlet Park Taichung
 Zhenwu Temple

Transportation 
 Port of Taichung

Infrastructure
 Taichung LNG Terminal

Notable natives 
 Shih Chun-jen, Minister of Department of Health (1986–1990)

References

External links 
  
 Port of Taichung website

Districts of Taichung